72nd parallel may refer to:

72nd parallel north, a circle of latitude in the Northern Hemisphere
72nd parallel south, a circle of latitude in the Southern Hemisphere